Reydnier Chavez is a Venezuelan ten-pin bowler. He finished in 22nd position of the combined rankings at the 2006 AMF World Cup.

References

Living people
Year of birth missing (living people)
Venezuelan ten-pin bowling players
Place of birth missing (living people)
21st-century Venezuelan people